The head is the part of an animal or human that usually includes the brain, eyes, ears, nose, and mouth.

Head or Heads may also refer to:
 Human head

Arts, entertainment, and media

Music

Albums 

 Heads (Bob James album), 1977
 Head (The Jesus Lizard album), 1990
 Head (The Monkees album), a 1968 soundtrack of the movie
 Heads (Osibisa album), 1972

Songs 

 "Head" (Julian Cope song), 1991
 "Head" (Prince song)
 "Head", a song by Mark Lanegan from Bubblegum
 "Head", a song by Static-X from Beneath... Between... Beyond...
 "Head", a song by Todd Sheaffer from The Black Bear Sessions and Elko
 "Head", a song by Lotion from full Isaac
 "Head", a song by The Cooper Temple Clause from the album Make This Your Own
 "Head", a song by Don Patterson from the album Mellow Soul
 "Heads", a song by Hawkwind from The Xenon Codex
 "Heads", a song by James from the album Living in Extraordinary Times

Other music 
 Head (band), an English rock band
 The Head (band), an indie rock band from Atlanta, Georgia
 Head (music), a main theme in jazz
 Drumhead, a membrane on a drum
 Headstock, a part of an instrument
 Brian Welch (born 1970), American musician better known as Head

Film and television 
 Head (film), a 1968 film starring The Monkees
 Heads (film), a 1994 black comedy about a reporter investigating decapitations
 The Head (1959 film), a German horror film directed by Victor Trivas
The Head (2003 film), a Russian black comedy
 The Head (1994 TV series), a 1994–1996 American animated television series
 The Head (2020 TV series), a 2020 psychological thriller series
 "Head" (Blackadder), a 1986 episode of Blackadder
 "Head" (American Horror Story), a 2013 episode of the anthology television series

Other arts 
 Head (Csaky), a 1913 Cubist sculpture by Joseph Csaky
 Head (DC Comics), a minor character in the fictional DC universe

Companies and brands 
 Head (company), a manufacturer and marketer of sports equipment
 Head Entertainment, a chain of retail stores
 Head Shampoo, an American organic hair product

Computing 
 head (Unix), a UNIX command
 <head>, an HTML document structure element
 HEAD, an HTTP request method
 Head, a reference to a commit object to a Repository

Maritime 
 Head (watercraft), the toilet on a watercraft
 Head (sail), the uppermost corner part of a sail
 Head race or crew race, a time-trial rowing competition and related events called 'Head of the __ River'
 Headsail, any sail set forward of the foremost mast

Science 
 Head (botany), a structure composed of numerous individual flowers
 Head (geology), a recent near-surface deposit
 Head (linguistics), the word that determines the syntactic type of the phrase of which it is a member
 Head of tide, the highest point on a river affected by tidal fluctuations
 Head (hydrology), the point on a watercourse, up to which it has been changed by damming
 Headland, also known as a head, a type of peninsula
 High Energy Astrophysics Division, a division of the American Astronomical Society
 Hydraulic head, an elevation difference between two fluid surfaces that drives flow
 Pressure head, a term used in fluid mechanics to represent the internal energy of a fluid due to the pressure exerted on its container
 Total dynamic head, the total equivalent height that a fluid is to be pumped, taking into account friction losses in the pipe

Technology 
 Cylinder head, a part of an internal combustion engine
 Head (vessel), an end cap on a pressure vessel
 Head unit, a component of an automobile or home stereo system
 Recording head, the physical interface between a recording apparatus and a moving recording medium
 Disk read-and-write head, part of a disk drive
 Sprinkler head, a component of a fire sprinkler system

Titles 
 Head coach, senior coach of an athletic team
 Head girl and head boy, positions in student government
 Head of government, the most senior executive of a cabinet and government
 Head of mission, the senior diplomat in a foreign post
 Head of state, the most senior public representative of a state
 Head teacher, the most senior teacher and leader of a school
 Head, a person who uses psychoactive drugs, such as a cokehead

Other uses 
 Head (surname), a surname (and list of people with that name)
 The Head, Queensland, Australia
 Beer head, a frothy emulsion at the top of a serving of beer
 Head of radius, part of the forearm bone
 Sydney Heads or simply The Heads, headlands that form the entrance to Sydney Harbour
 Viscount Head, a title in the Peerage of the United Kingdom
 Head baronets, two titles, one extinct in the Baronetage of England, the other extant in the Baronetage of the UK
 Head, the flat end of a barrel
 Head, slang for oral sex
 Heads, the obverse of a coin; as in "heads or tails"

See also 
 Headed (disambiguation)
 Header (disambiguation)
 Heading (disambiguation)
 Heads in heraldry